Youssef Semaan Barakat (born 9 December 1975) is a Lebanese Maronite priest and former footballer who played as a left-back for Salam Zgharta and the Lebanon national team.

International career 
Barakat played for the Lebanon national team in 1999, playing four games at the 1999 Pan Arab Games.

After football
Barakat holds a Bachelor of Theology from the Holy Spirit University of Kaslik. In July 2016, he became a priest of the Lebanese Maronite Church, and was part of the Eparchy of Ehden–Zgharta.

References

External links
 
 

Living people
1974 births
People from Zgharta
Lebanese footballers
Association football fullbacks
Salam Zgharta FC players
Lebanese Premier League players
Lebanon international footballers
Lebanese Maronites
Eastern Catholic priests